was a town located in Kurate District, Fukuoka Prefecture, Japan.

As of 2003, the town had an estimated population of 20,984 and a density of 399.77 persons per km². The total area was 52.49 km².

On February 11, 2006, Miyata was merged with the town of Wakamiya (also from Kurate District) to create the city of Miyawaka.

External links
 Miyawaka official website 

Dissolved municipalities of Fukuoka Prefecture
Populated places disestablished in 2006
2006 disestablishments in Japan